Euprimateformes are group of plesiadapiformes that includes euprimates and plesiadapoids, proposed by Bloch et al. in 2007.

Phylogeny 
Hypothesis of evolutionary relationships for plesiadapiforms and closely related taxa based on the most parsimonious single cladogram from the analysis of maximum parsimony by Bloch et al. (2007).

References 

Plesiadapiformes
Taxa described in 2007